Mogi Bayat (Teheran, June 24, 1974), official name Arnaud Bayat, is an Iranian-French businessman. He is the head of football of the Football Club de Nantes since 2017. He is the nephew of Abbas Bayat and the brother of Mehdi Bayat.

Biography 
The Iran-born Mogi Bayat moved to the United States when he was 6 years old, where he was getting treatment. One year later, he and his family moved to France.

Bayat became a businessman and became the director of the fruit juice brand Sunnyland France. He stopped with this in 2003 when he was appointed as managing director of football club Sporting Charleroi. 

Since December 2010 Bayat became active as a player broker. He had influence on the transfers of Anthony Limbombe, Kaveh Rezaei, Obbi Oulare, Lukasz Teodorczyk, Massimo Bruno, Adrien Trebel, Samuel Kalu, Bubacarr Sanneh, Thomas Foket and other players.

On 10 October 2018 Bayat was arrested. He was suspected of money laundering and matchfixing.

In April 2019, the sale of €18.5 million player Aleksandar Mitrović triggered Belgian police raids and money laundering investigations. Herman Van Holsbeeck, former manager of R.S.C. Anderlecht, and Bayat were detained for questioning. Bayat was released on conditional bail six weeks later. Van Holsbeeck was released immediately.

In a radio interview with "After Foot RMC" in June 2020, Bayat compared himself to Nelson Mandela and tried to defend his record. He is said to have a monopoly on the transfer business of FC Nantes.
In December 2020, in the course of the investigation against Bayat, police officers searched the training center of FC Nantes. Bayat has been very influential at FC Nantes over the last decade.

See also
2017–18 Belgian football fraud investigation

References 

living people
1974 births
French businesspeople
Iranian businesspeople
Association football executives